The FIBA Saporta Cup was the name of the second-tier level European-wide professional club basketball competition, where the domestic National Cup winners, from all over Europe, played against each other. The competition was organized by FIBA Europe. It was named after the late Raimundo Saporta, a former Real Madrid director.

History
The competition was created in 1966, as the FIBA European Cup Winners' Cup, but it had several denominations, until its eventual folding in 2002:

 1966–67 to 1990–91 FIBA European Cup Winners' Cup
 1991–92 to 1995–96 FIBA European Cup
 1996–97 to 1997–98 FIBA EuroCup
 1998–99 to 2001–02 FIBA Saporta Cup

The final Saporta Cup season was held during the 2001–02 season. After that, it was fused with the FIBA Korać Cup, into the newly formed ULEB Cup competition, now known as the EuroCup.

Finals

Titles by club

Titles by nation

FIBA Saporta Cup records

FIBA Saporta Cup awards

Winning rosters

FIBA European Cup Winners' Cup:

 1966–67  Ignis Varese

Stan McKenzie, Sauro Bufalini, Dino Meneghin, Giambattista Cescutti, Ottorino Flaborea, Massimo Villetti, Paolo Vittori, Enrico Bovone, Pierangelo Gergati, Roberto Gergati (Head Coach: Vittorio Tracuzzi)

 1967–68  AEK

Georgios Amerikanos, Georgios Trontzos, Christos Zoupas, Stelios Vasileiadis, Eas Larentzakis, Antonis Christeas, Lakis Tsavas, Petros Petrakis, Nikos Nesiadis, Andreas Dimitriadis, Georgios Moschos† (Head Coach: Nikos Milas)

†Moschos died of cancer in 1966, but he was inducted into the AEK Hall of Fame in 2008, and added to the 1968 championship team as an honorary member.

 1968–69  Slavia VŠ Praha

Jiří Zídek Sr., Jiří Růžička, Robert Mifka, Jiri Ammer, Bohumil Tomášek, Karel Baroch, Jaroslav Krivy, Jiří Konopásek (Head Coach: Jaroslav Šíp)

 1969–70  Fides Napoli

Miles Aiken, Jim Williams, Sauro Bufalini, Carlos d'Aquila, Remo Maggetti, Giovanni Gavagnin, Francesco Ovi, Antonio Errico, Vincenzo Errico, Manfredo Fucile, Renato Abbate, Leonardo Coen (Head Coach: Antonio Zorzi)

 1970–71  Simmenthal Milano

Art Kenney, Massimo Masini, Renzo Bariviera, Giulio Iellini, Giorgio Giomo, Giuseppe Brumatti, Paolo Bianchi, Giorgio Papetti, Mauro Cerioni, Roberto Paleari, Giorgio Gaggiotti (Head Coach: Cesare Rubini)

 1971–72  Simmenthal Milano

Art Kenney, Massimo Masini, Renzo Bariviera, Giulio Iellini, Giuseppe Brumatti, Mauro Cerioni, Paolo Bianchi, Giorgio Giomo, Doriano Iacuzzo, Sergio Borlenghi, Claudio Ferrari (Head Coach: Cesare Rubini)

 1972–73  Spartak Leningrad

Alexander Belov, Yuri Pavlov, Alexander Bolshakov, Yuri Shtukin, Andrei Makeev, Vladimir Yakovlev, Sergei Kuznetsov, Leonid Ivanov, Valeri Fjodorov, Ivan Dvorny, Evgeni Volkov, Ivan Rozhin (Head Coach: Vladimir Kondrashin)

 1973–74  Crvena zvezda

Zoran Slavnić, Ljubodrag Simonović, Dragan Kapičić, Dragiša Vučinić, Radivoje Živković, Ivan Sarjanović, Zoran Lazarević, Dragoje Jovašević, Goran Rakočević, Ljupče Žugić (Head Coach: Aleksandar Nikolić)

 1974–75  Spartak Leningrad

Alexander Belov, Yuri Pavlov, Alexander Bolshakov, Vladimir Arzamaskov, Yuri Shtukin, Andrei Makeev, Vladimir Yakovlev, Sergei Kuznetsov, Mikhail Silantev, Leonid Ivanov, Valeri Fjodorov (Head Coach: Vladimir Kondrashin)

 1975–76  Cinzano Milano

Mike Sylvester, Austin "Red" Robbins, Giuseppe Brumatti, Paolo Bianchi, Antonio Francescatto, Sergio Borlenghi, Vittorio Ferracini, Franco Boselli, Maurizio Borghese, Maurizio Benatti, Dino Boselli, Paolo Friz (Head Coach: Filippo Faina)

 1976–77  Birra Forst Cantù

Bob Lienhard, Hart Wingo, Pierlo Marzorati, Carlo Recalcati, Fabrizio Della Fiori, Renzo Tombolato, Franco Meneghel, Giorgio Cattini, Roberto Natalini, Umberto Cappelletti, Non Prezzati, Bruno Carapacchi, Giampiero Cortinovis (Head Coach: Arnaldo Taurisano)

 1977–78  Gabetti Cantù

Bob Lienhard, Hart Wingo, Pierlo Marzorati, Carlo Recalcati, Fabrizio Della Fiori, Fausto Bargna, Renzo Tombolato, Franco Meneghel, Giuseppe Gergati, Denis Innocentin, Umberto Cappelletti, Davide Bertazzini, Fabio Brambilla (Head Coach: Arnaldo Taurisano)

 1978–79  Gabetti Cantù

Johnny Neumann, Dave Batton, Pierlo Marzorati, Carlo Recalcati, Fabrizio Della Fiori, Renzo Bariviera, Renzo Tombolato, Denis Innocentin, Umberto Cappelletti, Antonello Riva, Non Porro, Giorgio Panzini (Head Coach: Arnaldo Taurisano)

 1979–80  Emerson Varese

Bob Morse, Dino Meneghin, Bruce Seals, Aldo Ossola, Alberto Mottini, Maurizio Gualco, Enzo Carraria, Fabio Colombo, Mauro Salvaneschi, Antonio Campiglio, Riccardo Caneva, Marco Bergonzoni (Head Coach: Edoardo Rusconi)

 1980–81  Squibb Cantù

Pierlo Marzorati, Antonello Riva, Bruce Flowers, Tom Boswell, Renzo Bariviera, Renzo Tombolato, Denis Innocentin, Giorgio Cattini, Terry Stotts, Umberto Cappelletti, Eugenio Masolo, Antonio Sala, Valerio Fumagalli, Giuseppe Bosa (Head Coach: Valerio Bianchini)

 1981–82  Cibona

Krešimir Ćosić, Aleksandar Petrović, Andro Knego, Zoran Čutura, Mihovil Nakić, Sven Ušić, Damir Pavličević, Adnan Bečić, Rajko Gospodnetić, Mlađan Cetinja, Toni Bevanda, Srđan Savović (Head Coach: Mirko Novosel)

 1982–83  Scavolini Pesaro

Dragan Kićanović, Željko Jerkov, Walter Magnifico, Mike Sylvester, Domenico Zampolini, Giuseppe Ponzoni, Amos Benevelli, Alessandro Boni, Massimo Bini, Gianluca Del Monte, Fabio Mancini, Antonio Sassanelli (Head Coach: Petar Skansi)

 1983–84  Real Madrid

Juan Antonio Corbalán, Brian Jackson, Fernando Martín, Wayne Robinson, Rafael Rullán, Fernando Romay, Juan Manuel López Iturriaga, Antonio Martín, Francisco José Velasco, Juan Antonio Orenga, Wilson Simon (Head Coach: Lolo Sainz)

 1984–85  FC Barcelona

Juan Antonio San Epifanio, Chicho Sibilio, Ignacio Solozábal, Mike Davis, Otis Howard, Juan Domingo De la Cruz, Xavi Crespo, Pedro Ansa, Arturo Seara, Julián Ortiz, Ángel Heredero (Head Coach: Antoni Serra / Manuel Flores)

 1985–86  FC Barcelona

Juan Antonio San Epifanio, Chicho Sibilio, Ignacio Solozábal, Greg Wiltjer, Mark Smith, Juan Domingo De la Cruz, Xavi Crespo, Arturo Seara, Julián Ortiz, Steve Trumbo, Ferran Martínez, Ángel Heredero, Jordi Soler (Head Coach: Aíto García Reneses)

 1986–87  Cibona

Dražen Petrović, Aleksandar Petrović, Danko Cvjetićanin, Andro Knego, Zoran Čutura, Mihovil Nakić, Franjo Arapović, Sven Ušić, Branko Vukićević, Adnan Bečić, Nebojša Razić (Head Coach: Janez Drvarič / Mirko Novosel)

 1987–88  Limoges CSP

Richard Dacoury, Clarence Kea, Stéphane Ostrowski, Greg Beugnot, Don Collins, Jacques Monclar, Hugues Occansey, Georges Vestris, Alain Forestier, Frederic Guinot, Jean-Luc Hribersek, Laurent Vinsou, Franck Maquaire (Head Coach: Michel Gomez)

 1988–89  Real Madrid

Dražen Petrović, Johnny Rogers, Fernando Martín, José Biriukov, Antonio Martín, Pep Cargol, Fernando Romay, José Luis Llorente, Enrique Villalobos, Javier Pérez, Miguel Ángel Cabral, Carlos García (Head Coach: Lolo Sainz)

 1989–90  Knorr Bologna

Micheal Ray Richardson, Roberto Brunamonti, Mike Sylvester, Clemon Johnson, Gus Binelli, Lauro Bon, Claudio Coldebella, Vittorio Gallinari, Massimiliano Romboli, Clivo Massimo Righi, Tommaso Tasso, Davide Bonora, Andrea Cempini (Head Coach: Ettore Messina)

 1990–91  PAOK

Bane Prelević, Ken Barlow, John Korfas, Panagiotis Fasoulas, Nikos Boudouris, Nikos Stavropoulos, Georgios Makaras, Panagiotis Papachronis, Memos Ioannou, Achilleas Mamatziolas, Lazaros Tsakiris, Georgios Valavanidis (Head Coach: Dragan Šakota)

FIBA European Cup:

 1991–92  Real Madrid Asegurator

Rickey Brown, Mark Simpson, José Biriukov, Antonio Martín, Fernando Romay, José Miguel Antúnez, Pep Cargol, José Luis Llorente, Enrique Villalobos, Jonatan Ángel Ojeda, José María Silva, Tomás González (Head Coach: Clifford Luyk)

 1992–93  Sato Aris

Roy Tarpley, Panagiotis Giannakis, J. J. Anderson, Michail Misunov, Dinos Angelidis, Vangelis Vourtzoumis, Georgios Gasparis, Vassilis Lipiridis, Memos Ioannou, Igor Moraitov, Theodosios Paralikas (Head Coach: Zvi Sherf)

 1993–94  Smelt Olimpija

Dušan Hauptman, Roman Horvat, Boris Gorenc, Žarko Đurišić, Marko Tušek, Nebojša Razić, Marijan Kraljević, Jaka Daneu, Vitali Nosov, Klemen Zaletel (Head Coach: Zmago Sagadin)

 1994–95  Benetton Treviso

Petar Naumoski, Orlando Woolridge, Ken Barlow, Stefano Rusconi, Riccardo Pittis, Massimo Iacopini, Andrea Gracis, Denis Marconato, Alberto Vianini, Riccardo Esposito, Maurizio Ragazzi, Federico Peruzzo, Paolo Casonato (Head Coach: Mike D'Antoni)

 1995–96  Taugrés

Velimir Perasović, Kenny Green, Ramón Rivas, Marcelo Nicola, Jordi Millera, Miguel Ángel Reyes, Ferran Lopez, Jorge Garbajosa, Juan Pedro Cazorla, Carlos Cazorla, Carlos Dicenta, Pedro Rodríguez, Juan Ignacio Gómez (Head Coach: Manel Comas)

FIBA EuroCup:

 1996–97  Real Madrid Teka

Dejan Bodiroga, Joe Arlauckas, Alberto Herreros, Mike Smith, Juan Antonio Morales, Juan Antonio Orenga, Alberto Angulo, José Miguel Antúnez, Ismael Santos, Roberto Núñez, Pablo Laso, Lorenzo Sanz (Head Coach: Željko Obradović)

 1997–98  Žalgiris

Saulius Štombergas, Ennis Whatley, Franjo Arapović, Dainius Adomaitis, Tomas Masiulis, Virginijus Praškevičius, Darius Maskoliūnas, Kęstutis Šeštokas, Mindaugas Žukauskas, Eurelijus Žukauskas, Darius Sirtautas, Tauras Stumbrys, Danya Abrams (Head Coach: Jonas Kazlauskas)

FIBA Saporta Cup:

 1998–99  Benetton Treviso

Henry Williams, Željko Rebrača, Marcelo Nicola, Glenn Sekunda, William Di Spalatro, Tomás Jofresa, Denis Marconato, Casey Schmidt, Davide Bonora, Riccardo Pittis, Oliver Narr, Stjepan Stazić, Matteo Maestrello (Head Coach: Željko Obradović)

 1999–00  AEK

Anthony Bowie, Martin Müürsepp, Michalis Kakiouzis, Angelos Koronios, Nikos Chatzis, Dimos Dikoudis, Iakovos "Jake" Tsakalidis, Dan O'Sullivan, Steve Hansell, Vassilis Kikilias, Nikos Papanikolopoulos, Miltos Moschou (Head Coach: Dušan Ivković)

 2000–01  Maroussi

Ashraf Amaya, Jimmy Oliver, Vasco Evtimov, Georgios Maslarinos, Alexis Falekas, Sotirios Nikolaidis, Vangelis Vourtzoumis, Dimitris Marmarinos, Dimitris Karaplis, Vangelis Logothetis, Sotiris Manolopoulos, Charalampos Charalampidis, Kostas Anagnostou (Head Coach: Vangelis Alexandris)

 2001–02  Montepaschi Siena

Petar Naumoski, Vrbica Stefanov, Brian Tolbert, Boris Gorenc, Milenko Topić, Roberto Chiacig, Mindaugas Žukauskas, Nikola Bulatović, Alpay Öztaş, Marco Rossetti, Germán Scarone, Andrea Pilotti (Head Coach: Ergin Ataman)

See also
Rosters of the top basketball teams in European club competitions
European Basketball Club Super Cup

External links
FIBA Saporta Cup @ FIBA Europe.com
FIBA Saporta Cup Winners 
FIBA Saporta Cup @ LinguaSport.com

 
Saporta Cup
International club basketball competitions
Recurring sporting events established in 1966
1966 establishments in Europe
2002 disestablishments in Europe
Recurring sporting events disestablished in 2002